The  was a short-lived domain of the Empire of Japan, lasting from 1872 to 1879, before becoming the current Okinawa Prefecture and other islands at the Pacific edge of the East China Sea.

When the domain was created in 1872, Japan's feudal han system had developed in unique ways. The domain was a political and economic abstraction based on periodic cadastral surveys and projected agricultural yields.  In other words, the domain was defined in terms of kokudaka, not land area. This was different from the feudalism of the West.

History

In 1609, the invasion of Ryukyu caused a change in the relationship of the island nation and Japan.  After 1609, the Ryukyuan kings were forced to be vassals of the Shimazu clan of Satsuma and the islands were occasionally viewed as a province of Japan.  At the same time, the kingdom and its rulers remained carefully independent, and also paid tribute to China.

The dual nature of the kingdom and its rulers was eliminated with the creation of the Ryukyu Domain which existed from 1872 through 1879.  In 1872, the Emperor of Japan changed the title of Shō Tai, who was the Ryukyu Kingdom's monarch (琉球国王 Ryūkyū-koku-ō).  Instead, Shō Tai became a domain head (琉球藩王 Ryūkyū-han-ō). In other words, the Ryukyu Kingdom was then recognized as a han. The former monarch and Ryukyuan aristocrats were granted lands and stipends of support in this period.  The administration of the Ryukyus was established under the jurisdiction of the Foreign Ministry.  After the Taiwan Expedition of 1874, Japan's role as the protector of the Ryukyuan people was acknowledged; but fiction of the Ryukyu Kingdom's independence was partially maintained until 1879.<ref>Goodenough, Ward H.  Book Review: "George H. Kerr. Okinawa: the History of an Island People ...,"] The Annals of the American Academy of Political and Social Science, May 1959, Vol. 323, No. 1, p. 165.</ref>  In 1875, administrative jurisdiction over the Ryukyus was transferred from the Foreign Ministry to the Home Ministry.

In 1879, Shō Tai was forced to abdicate and move to Tokyo, Ryukyu Domain was abolished, and Okinawa Prefecture was established. Shō Tai was given the title of Marquis and added to the list of Japan's peerage.
Resistance against the decision
In 1876, Kōchi Chōjō  gathered other Ryukyuans who, like himself, had fled for China, including Rin Seikō (林世功) and Sai Taitei (蔡大鼎). Together, they submitted numerous petitions to the Qing officials asking for help on behalf of the kingdom. Though there was little, if any, positive response for a long time, Chōjō and others refused to give up.

See also
 History of the Ryukyu Islands
 Ryūkyū Disposition

Notes

References
 Kerr, George H. (1958). Okinawa: the History of an Island People. Rutland, Vermont: Charles Tuttle Co. OCLC 722356
 ___. (1953). Ryukyu Kingdom and Province before 1945.'' Washington, D.C.: National Academy of Sciences, National Research Council. [https://www.worldcat.org/oclc/5455582 OCLC 5455582
 Nussbaum, Louis-Frédéric and Käthe Roth. (2005).  Japan encyclopedia. Cambridge: Harvard University Press. ;  OCLC 58053128

Domains of Japan
History of Okinawa Prefecture
Ryukyu Kingdom
Ryukyu Islands
1870s in Asia
1870s in Japan
1872 establishments in Japan
1879 disestablishments in Japan